State Route 263 (SR 263) is a state highway in the U.S. state of California in Siskiyou County, running parallel to Interstate 5 to the west. Route 263 connects State Route 3 near the north city limits of Yreka to State Route 96 eight miles (13 km) north. Although SR 263 was once part of U.S. Route 99, it is not signed as part Business Loop 5.

Route description

The road begins at a junction with State Route 3 just north of Yreka. The highway then heads northward through Siskiyou County, roughly lying parallel to the Shasta River. The road is also roughly aligned with nearby Interstate 5 as it passes through hilly terrain. The road ends at State Route 96, which continues northward to meet up with Interstate 5.

SR 263 is part of the National Highway System, a network of highways that are considered essential to the country's economy, defense, and mobility by the Federal Highway Administration.

Major intersections

See also

References

External links

California @ AARoads.com - State Route 263
Caltrans: Route 263 highway conditions
California Highways: SR 263

263
State Route 263
U.S. Route 99
Yreka, California